Rangsan is a masculine Thai given name. Notable people with the given name include:

Rangsan Chayanram, Thai boxer
Rangsan Iam-Wiroj (born 1982), Thai footballer
Rangsan Roobmoh, Thai footballer
Rangsan Torsuwan, Thai architect
Rangsan Viwatchaichok, Thai football coach
Rangsan Wiroonsri, Thai footballer

Thai masculine given names